Supersensitivity may refer to:

Denervation supersensitivity
Supersensitivity psychosis
Disuse supersensitivity
Hyperesthesia, abnormal increase in sensitivity to stimuli of the sense
Supertaster

See also
Hypersensitivity